Dr. Stone is a Japanese anime television series produced by TMS Entertainment, based on the manga series of the same name, written by Riichiro Inagaki, illustrated by Boichi, and published in Shueisha's Weekly Shōnen Jump magazine. 3,700 years after a mysterious light turns every human on the planet into stone, genius boy Senku Ishigami emerges from his petrification into a "Stone World" and seeks to rebuild human civilization from the ground up. The series is directed by Shinya Iino, with Yuichiro Kido as scriptwriter, and Yuko Iwasa as character designer. Tatsuya Kato, Hiroaki Tsutsumi, and Yuki Kanesaka compose the series' music. The first opening was 'Good Morning World' by BURNOUT SYNDROMES, was used from episodes 1–12. The second opening, 'Sangenshoku' by Pelican Fanclub, was used from episodes 13–24. The first ending, 'Life' by Rude-a, was used from episodes 1–12. The second ending, 'Yume no You na' by Yusuke Saeki, was used from episodes 13–24. The first season aired from July 5 to December 13, 2019 on Tokyo MX and other channels. The first season ran for 24 episodes. The series is streamed by Crunchyroll worldwide outside of Asia, and Funimation produced a simuldub. The English dub of the anime began airing on Adult Swim's Toonami programming block on August 25, 2019.

A second season of the anime series was announced after the first season's finale. The second season focused on the story of the "Stone Wars" arc from the manga series.  Officially titled as Dr. Stone: Stone Wars, the second season aired from January 14 to March 25, 2021.

A sequel to the TV series was announced after the second season's final episode aired. At the Jump Festa 2022 event, it was revealed that a third season will premiere in 2023. A television special titled Dr. Stone: Ryusui that focuses on the character Ryusui Nanami premiered on July 10, 2022. Shūhei Matsushita directed the special, while the rest of the main staff are returning from previous seasons. After the airing of the special, the third season's title was revealed to be Dr. Stone: New World, with Matsushita returning to direct. It is set to premiere on April 6, 2023, and will consist of two split cours.

Series overview

Episode list

Season 1 (2019)

Season 2: Stone Wars (2021)

Dr. Stone: Ryusui (2022)

Season 3: New World (2023)

Notes

References

External links
 

Dr. Stone
Dr. Stone episode lists